The 1994–95 BCAFL was the 10th full season of the British Collegiate American Football League, organised by the British Students American Football Association.

Changes from last season
Division Changes
The two Conferences were split into Divisions:
Northern Conference became the Scottish, Eastern & Central Divisions
Southern Conference became the Eastern, Central & Western Divisions

Team Changes
University of Aberdeen joined the Northern Conference, as the Steamrollers
University of Hertfordshire joined the Southern Conference, as the Hurricanes
Leicester Lemmings moved from the Southern Conference to the Northern Conference, Central Division.
Loughborough Aces moved from the Southern Conference to the Northern Conference, Central Division.
Staffordshire Stallions moved from the Southern Conference to the Northern Conference, Central Division.
University of Surrey joined the Southern Conference, as the Stingers
This increased the number of teams in BCAFL to 29.

Regular season

Northern Conference, Scottish Division

Northern Conference, Eastern Division

Northern Conference, Central Division

Southern Conference, Eastern Division

Southern Conference, Central Division

Southern Conference, Western Division

Playoffs

Note – the table does not indicate who played home or away in each fixture.

References

External links
 Official BUAFL Website
 Official BAFA Website

1994
1995 in British sport
1994 in British sport
1995 in American football
1994 in American football